Dave's Texaco is a site on the National Register of Historic Places located in Chinook, Montana.  It was added to the Register on August 16, 1994.  The building was a gas station and has also been known as Dave's Exxon and as Dave's Conoco.  The building is made of stucco on a concrete foundation and with an asphalt roof.

It was built in 1927 on U.S. Route 2 which has since been rerouted two blocks away.  It sold Texaco products exclusively until 1978 when Texaco ceased doing business in Montana.  Its third owner, David Sprinkle, operated the business from 1938 until at least 1993.

See also 
 Deerfield Texaco Service Station, 1923 station in Deerfield, Kansas

References

Gas stations on the National Register of Historic Places in Montana
Texaco
National Register of Historic Places in Blaine County, Montana
1927 establishments in Texas
Commercial buildings completed in 1927